The International Harvester Travelall is a model line of vehicles that were manufactured by International Harvester; four generations were produced from 1953 to 1975.  Derived from the International light truck line, the Travelall was a truck-based station wagon.  One of the first competitors to the Chevrolet Suburban, the Travelall was a forerunner of modern people carriers and full-size sport utility vehicles.

As International withdrew from light-truck sales, the Travelall and pickup truck lines were discontinued after the 1975 model year, followed by the Scout in 1980.

Background
Prior to 1953, International Harvester did not produce a station wagon as part of its model range.  Though traditionally derived from passenger cars, wood-bodied station wagons using International truck chassis were constructed on a third-party basis (called station wagons).  Moving away from woodies, following World War II, K-series panel vans served as the basis for airport people movers, adding windows and rear seats.

Following its introduction for the R/S light trucks, the Travelall would follow the development of the International pickup truck model line.  In 1958, a third door was added, nine years before the Suburban; the fourth door came in 1961 (12 years before GM).  The Travelette was a four-door crew-cab pickup, sharing its bodywork with the Travelall wagon.

First generation (1953-1957)

International introduced the R-Series truck range in 1953, replacing the L-Series.  Ranging from -ton trucks to heavy commercial trucks, the R-Series introduced the Travelall as a metal-bodied station wagon.  Replacing the previous wood-bodied wagons, the Travelall was a windowed panel van with rear seats.  In line with sedan-based wagons of the time, access to the rear seats of the R-Series Travelalls was gained by flipping up the passenger-side front seat.  Two or three rear seats were offered; panel-truck "barn doors" were standard, with a wagon-style tailgate as an option.

In addition to the International name badge, a Travelall name badge was mounted on the front cowl.  A few L-Series trucks were also produced with windows and seats in 1952, but whether the Travelall name was used that year is unknown.

The first-generation Travelall was offered in the R-110 series on the  wheelbase.  A 220 cubic-inch "Silver Diamond" I6 was rated at 100 hp.

In 1955, the R-Series was replaced by the S-Series, with the Travelall offered as the S-110 or heavier duty S-120.  A BD 220 engine was similar to the R-Series.   Four-wheel drive became a factory option for 1956.

Second generation (1958-1960)

Introduced in 1957 for the 1958 model year, the A-series (for "Anniversary", marking fifty years of International Harvester truck production) offered a 2nd passenger side door for improved access to the rear seats. Models A-100, A-110, and A-120 all came with  six-cylinder engines, with four-wheel drive optional on the A-120. The design changes paralleled those of the A-series pickups.

Although only lightly modified, the B-Line trucks that appeared in 1959 offered upgraded options for the Travelall. Power steering, power brakes, V-8 engines, and other comfort, convenience, and visual appeal features were introduced to make the Travelall more mainstream and less commercial. The Travelall was offered in the B-100/B-110/B-112 ½-ton range only in 4x2 form. The B-120 was a ¾-ton rated model and that was the only Travelall to come in four-wheel drive in this era. A B-122 model featured uprated springs for a higher GVW. The B-Line trucks carried on into the 1961 model year, when another mild facelift transformed them again into the C-Line.

Third generation (1961-1968)

In April 1961 the Travelall underwent the same changes as the pickup range upon which it was based. The new C-series Travelall benefitted from a whole new chassis with all new independent front torsion bar suspension. Aside from the lower body, the most obvious visual difference were that the twin headlights were now mounted side by side, and a new grille of a concave egg-crate design. The wheelbase for the C-100/C-110 Travelall went up to 119 inches, as the front wheels were mounted further forward. This adjustment increased the front clearance angle in spite of the lower body.

This series was available either with a flip-down tailgate or two doors. The fold down gate had a window which wound down electrically. Development continued in a gradual fashion, becoming the D-series in 1965. A steady stream of new grilles and headlight treatments set the model years apart until a more thorough makeover took place in 1969. Until this model change, the Travelall had been considered merely a version of the related pickup truck; after the facelift the Travelall became a separate series.

Fourth generation (1969-1975)

For 1969 production, International released the fourth-generation Travelall alongside the redesigned D-series pickups. Sized roughly between the Jeep Wagoneer and the Chevrolet/GMC Suburban, the Travelall was marketed as a truck-based station wagon.  While still maintaining mechanical commonality with the Light Line pickup trucks, International had largely split the Travelall into a distinct model line, slotting it above the Scout.

At its 1969 introduction, the fourth-generation Travelall was offered in 1000, 1100, and 1200 payload series.  As with the third generation, the 1969 Travelall was offered in both two-wheel drive and four-wheel drive configurations (optional on 1100 and 1200 series). In line with the Suburban, the Travelall was also offered with up to three rows of passenger seating.  While offered in a single trim level, the Travelall was offered in multiple interior configurations, ranging from relatively spartan to well-equipped versions sharing features in line with full-size station wagons (including exterior woodgrain trim).

For 1971, the Travelall received an update of the front fascia, shared with the Light Line pickups; the model series nomenclature was changed to 1010, 1110, and 1210; for 1972, the grille was revised again. For 1974, the Travelall underwent a second nomenclature change, offering 150 and 200 series. The model line adopted the chassis revisions of the pickup trucks, adopting a coil-sprung independent front suspension (replacing torsion bars).

Mechanical details 
Through its production, the fourth-generation Travelall was equipped with four different engines (shared between the Scout and the Light Line trucks).  An AMC-supplied 232 cubic-inch inline-6 as a standard engine for the 1000 from 1969 to 1971; as an option, International offered 304, 345, and 392 cubic-inch V8s.  For 1973 and 1974, in response to a short supply of IHC V8 engines, the Travelall was offered with an optional AMC 401 cubic-inch V8 (named the V-400 by IHC).  By 1975, following the adoption of net horsepower ratings, outputs were lowered to 141-172 hp. Engines were paired with either a manual or an automatic transmission.

In late 1971, International introduced a Bendix-developed anti-lock brake system, named Adaptive Braking System.  One of the first vehicles offered with any form of anti-lock brakes, the expensive option was rarely selected by owners.

Wagonmaster 
For 1973 and 1974, International marketed a pickup truck variant of the Travelall.  Named the Wagonmaster, the design removed the roof and windows of the cargo section, creating a pickup truck bed.  In contrast to the Travelette crew-cab, the Wagonmaster bed was integrated into the body; it was 5 feet in length  (reduced from the 6 feet and 8 feet offered with the Travelette).

While many Light Line pickup trucks were developed for work or farm use, the Wagonmaster was developed for a different market of truck users: owners of fifth-wheel RV trailers.  As the Wagonmaster shared its wheelbase with the Travelall, the fifth-wheel hitch was located behind the rear axle, providing unfavorable handling characteristics.  Coinciding with declining demand for the Travelall, the Wagonmaster was discontinued after 1974 production; it is unknown how many were produced (ranging from 500 to under 2000).

After the Wagonmaster was discontinued, International introduced a pickup-truck version of the Scout II (the Terra) for 1976; developed in a half-cab configuration, the Scout II Terra served as one of the first mid-size pickup trucks.  Though not designed for 5th-wheel tow use, the Chevrolet Avalanche of the 2000s revisited the concept of the Wagonmaster, as it adopted the body of the Chevrolet Suburban as a crew-cab pickup truck.

Discontinuation 
During the 1974 model year, sales of the model line began to collapse following the 1973 oil crisis.  For 1973, the Chevrolet/GMC Suburban received a fourth passenger door for the first time, placing the widely-available model line in direct competition with the fuel-thirsty Travelall (achieving 10-12mpg on average).  Though several years older than the Suburban (and far larger in size over the Jeep Wagoneer), the Travelall still retained high owner loyalty and satisfaction.

In May 1975, International Harvester discontinued the entire Light Line model series, which included both pickup trucks (including Travelette crew cabs) and the Travelall wagon (the Wagonmaster was discontinued after 1974).  The International consumer model line was pared down exclusively to the Scout II off-road vehicle, which remained in production through the 1980 model year.

Subsequently, International has shifted away from consumer vehicles, instead concentrating production on medium-duty and heavy-duty trucks.

Variants
Travelalls were also produced with raised roofs and extended wheelbases for applications such as school buses, ambulances and airport limos. Many of these modifications were performed by the Springfield Equipment Company and were marketed by International.

In popular culture 
In the films Grumpy Old Men and Grumpier Old Men Max Goldman drives a 1974 Travelall.

In the apocalyptic novel Lucifer's Hammer by Larry Niven and Jerry Pournelle, Harvey Randall uses a Travelall extensively.

Folk musician Greg Brown sings about a Travelall in his song Laughing River.

The cinematic musical group Calexico titled an instrumental, largely improvisational 2000 album Travelall.

The villain Michael Myers steals a 1956 International Travelall from a woman and her daughter in the 1998 movie Halloween: H20.

References

Further reading

External links

Full-size sport utility vehicles
Expanded length sport utility vehicles
Travelall
Vehicles introduced in 1953
1950s cars
1960s cars
1970s cars
Carryalls